The 1934 European Rowing Championships were rowing championships held on the Rotsee in the Swiss city of Lucerne. The competition was for men only and they competed in all seven Olympic boat classes (M1x, M2x, M2-, M2+, M4-, M4+, M8+).

Medal summary

References

European Rowing Championships
Rowing
Sport in Lucerne
European Rowing Championships
Rowing
European Rowing Championships